The fauna of Colombia is characterized by a high biodiversity, with the highest rate of species by area unit worldwide.

Endemic animals
Colombia has the largest number of endemic species (species that are not found naturally anywhere else) worldwide. About 10% of the species in the world live in Colombia. Some determinant factors in the distribution range of the species are the weather conditions, temperature, humidity and sunlight availability.

Endemics can easily become endangered or extinct due to their restricted habitat and vulnerability to the actions of man, including the introduction of new organisms.

Ecoregions with high endemism
According to the Colombian Ministry of Environment, the following ecoregions have the highest percentage of endemic species:
 Cocora valley (Quindío)
 Serranía de la Macarena (Meta Department)
 Gorgona, Colombia (island in the Pacific Ocean)
 Amacayacu National Park (Amazonas Department)

Environmental issues

Birds

Over 1800 species of birds have been described in Colombia, (more than the number of existent bird species in North America and Europe combined).
Some of the bird species in Colombia are:
 American redstart
 Groove-billed ani
 Spotted antbird
 White-plumed antbird
 Antioquia bristle-tyrant
 Northern slaty-antshrike
 Blackish-grey antshrike
 Black-faced antthrush
 White-flanked antwren
 Galapagos penguin
 Checker-throated stipplethroat
 Apical flycatcher
 Apolinar's wren
 Argus bare-eye
 Cinnamon attila
 Band-tailed barbthroat
 Pale-tailed barbthroat
 Baudó oropendola
 Beautiful woodpecker
 Bearded bellbird
 Black-and-gold tanager
 Black-chested buzzard-eagle
 Black-mandibled toucan
 Blackish tapaculo
 Bogotá rail
 Empress brilliant
 Fawn-breasted brilliant
 Brown-banded antpitta
 Buff-breasted mountain-tanager
 Red-rumped cacique
 Scarlet-rumped cacique
 Red-capped cardinal
 Grey catbird
 Little chachalaca
 Rufous-vented chachalaca
 Chestnut-bellied flower-piercer
 Chestnut-capped piha
 Chestnut-mandibled toucan
 Choco toucan
 Chocó vireo
 Clapper rail
 Andean cock-of-the-rock
 Guianan cock-of-the-rock
 Collared trogon
 Festive coquette
 Spangled coquette
 Buff-tailed coronet
 Velvet-purple coronet
 Pompadour cotinga
 Bronzed cowbird
 Crested ant-tanager
 Cundinamarca antpitta
 Great curassow
 Dickcissel
 Black-capped donacobius
 Common ground dove
 Grey-fronted dove
 Mourning dove
 White-tipped dove
 Dusky-headed brush-finch
 American harpy eagle
 Crested eagle
 Forest elaenia
 Yellow-crowned elaenia
 Andean emerald
 Blue-tailed emerald
 Glittering-throated emerald
 Versicolored emerald
 Euler's flycatcher
 Orange-bellied euphonia
 Purple-crowned fairy
 Laughing falcon
 Flame-winged parakeet
 Acadian flycatcher
 Fuscous flycatcher
 Great crested flycatcher
 Ruddy-tailed flycatcher
 Sulphur-bellied flycatcher
 Orange-breasted fruiteater
 Black-faced hawk
 Common black hawk
 Bronzy hermit
 Great-billed hermit
 Green hermit
 Grey-chinned hermit
 Long-billed hermit
 Reddish hermit
 Rufous-breasted hermit
 Sooty-capped hermit
 Stripe-throated hermit
 Tawny-bellied hermit
 White-whiskered hermit
 Zigzag heron
 Purple honeycreeper
 Giant hummingbird
 Green-bellied hummingbird
 Indigo-capped hummingbird
 Ruby-topaz hummingbird
 Rufous-tailed hummingbird
 Snowy-breasted hummingbird
 Speckled hummingbird
 Steely-vented hummingbird
 Violet-bellied hummingbird
 Buff-necked ibis
 Brown inca
 Collared inca
 Bronzy jacamar
 Green-tailed jacamar
 Pale-headed jacamar
 Paradise jacamar
 Rufous-tailed jacamar
 Yellow-billed jacamar
 White-necked jacobin
 Green jay
 American pygmy kingfisher
 Great kiskadee
 Long-wattled umbrellabird
 Blue-backed manakin
 Lance-tailed manakin
 Wire-tailed manakin
 Green-breasted mango
 Tyrian metaltail
 Tropical mockingbird
 Amazonian motmot
 Andean motmot
 Whooping motmot
 Rufous motmot
 Mountain grackle
 Moustached brush-finch
 Multicoloured tanager
 Niceforo's wren
 Lesser nighthawk
 Northern helmeted curassow
 Brown nunlet
 Rusty-breasted nunlet
 Oilbird
 Baltimore oriole
 Orchard oriole
 South American yellow oriole
 Pale-legged warbler
 Parker's antbird
 Mealy amazon
 Yellow-eared parrot
 Green-rumped parrotlet
 Western wood pewee
 Black phoebe
 Band-tailed pigeon
 Ruddy pigeon
 Short-billed pigeon
 Collared puffbird
 Russet-throated puffbird
 White-necked puffbird
 Colorful puffleg
 Gorgeted puffleg
 Golden-headed quetzal
 White-tipped quetzal
 Booted racket-tail
 Red-bellied grackle
 Royal flycatcher
 Rufous-breasted wren
 Rufous-fronted parakeet
 Rufous-tailed antthrush
 Rusty-headed spinetail
 Santa Marta antpitta
 Santa Marta brush-finch
 Santa Marta bush-tyrant
 Santa Marta mountain-tanager
 Santa Marta parakeet
 Santa Marta tapaculo
 Santa Marta warbler
 Santa Marta wren
 Blue-chinned sapphire
 Scarlet macaw
 Black-necked screamer
 Horned screamer
 Variable seedeater
 Buff-tailed sicklebill
 White-tipped sicklebill
 Silvery-throated spinetail
 Red siskin
 Yellow-bellied siskin
 Sooty ant-tanager
 Sooty-capped puffbird
 Orange-billed sparrow
 Blue-tufted starthroat
 Long-billed starthroat
 Black storm-petrel
 Least storm-petrel
 Streak-capped spinetail
 Gorgeted sunangel
 Orange-throated sunangel
 Tree swallow
 Swallow-wing
 Short-tailed swift
 Sick's swift
 Violet-tailed sylph
 Blue-grey tanager
 Fulvous-crested tanager
 Olive tanager
 Paradise tanager
 Scarlet tanager
 Turquoise tanager
 White-shouldered tanager
 Green thorntail
 Wire-crested thorntail
 Spectacled thrush
 Wood thrush
 Barred tinamou
 Berlepsch's tinamou
 Black tinamou
 Brown tinamou
 Choco tinamou
 Cinereous tinamou
 Colombian tinamou
 Great tinamou
 Grey tinamou
 Grey-legged tinamou
 Highland tinamou
 Little tinamou
 Magdalena tinamou
 Red-legged tinamou
 Rusty tinamou
 Tawny-breasted tinamou
 Undulated tinamou
 Variegated tinamou
 White-throated tinamou
 Tolima dove
 Channel-billed toucan
 Keel-billed toucan
 White-throated toucan
 Emerald toucanet
 Groove-billed toucanet
 Slaty-tailed trogon
 Grey-winged trumpeter
 Buffy tuftedcheek
 Streaked tuftedcheek
 Turquoise dacnis
 Turquoise-throated puffleg
 Southern beardless tyrannulet
 Upper Magdalena tapaculo
 Velvet-fronted euphonia
 Violaceous trogon
 Brown violetear
 Lesser violetear
 Sparkling violetear
 Black-and-white warbler
 Black-throated green warbler
 Blackpoll warbler
 Palm warbler
 Prairie warbler
 Townsend's warbler
 Yellow warbler
 Waved albatross
 Cedar waxwing
 White-crowned pigeon
 White-lored warbler
 White-mantled barbet
 Purple-bibbed whitetip
 Amazonian barred-woodcreeper
 Black-banded woodcreeper
 Straight-billed woodcreeper
 Violet-crowned woodnymph
 Acorn woodpecker
 Ringed woodpecker
 Yellow-throated woodpecker
 Purple-throated woodstar
 Band-backed wren
 Stripe-backed wren
 Yariguies brush-finch
 Yellow-crowned redstart
 Yellow-headed brush-finch
 Yellow-rumped warbler

The national bird

The Andean condor inhabits the Andes mountain range. Although it is primarily a scavenger, feeding on carrion, this species belongs to the New World vulture family Cathartidae.

The condor is one of the largest birds on earth with a wingspan ranging from 274 to 310 cm (108–122 in) and weighing up to 11–15 kg (24–33 lb) for males and 7.5–11 kg (16–24 lb) for females, but overall length can range from 117 to 135 cm (46 to 53 inches).

The adult plumage is of a uniform black, with the exception of a frill of white feathers nearly surrounding the base of the neck and, especially in the male, large patches or bands of white on the wings which do not appear until the completion of the first molting.

Mammals

There are 456 reported species of mammals in Colombia. Of these, about 22% are endangered or critically endangered. Most of the threatened species status are due to human activities, in particular destruction of plant and animal habitats driven by local consumption of organic resources, especially related to tropical forest destruction.

While most of the species that are becoming extinct are not food species, their biomass is converted into human food when their habitat is transformed into pasture and cropland.

Colombia has the largest number of terrestrial mammals species in the world, including among others:

 Colombian woolly monkey
 Colombian black-handed titi
 Coppery titi
 Lucifer titi
 Black titi
 Collared titipo
 Ornate titi
 White-fronted capuchin
 Olinguito
 Giant anteater
 Giant armadillo
 Greater long-nosed armadillo
 Hoffmann's two-toed sloth
 Jaguar
 Linnaeus's two-toed sloth
 Nine-banded armadillo
 Pale-throated thripee-toed sloth
 Pygmy marmoset
 Silky anteater
 Southern naked-tailed armadillo
 Southern tamandua
 Spectacled bear
 Brown-throated three-toed sloth
 Amazonian manatee
 West Indian manatee
 Hippopotamus. Most of the animals in Pablo Escobar's personal zoo were shipped back to their natural habitats except the hippopotamus; some escaped, and a wild population has established itself in Colombia's main river, the Magdelena. Spread over a growing area, nobody knows exactly how many there are, or what will be their lasting effect on the environment, but estimates of the total population in 2020 range from 40 to 60 individuals.

Amphibians

Colombia has the largest number of amphibians in the world (including frogs, toads, salamanders and caecilians) with 589 species, 208 of them being endangered, being the zoological group with the highest rate of endangerment. Some causes related with the decline of the amphibians are: chytridiomycosis, habitat destruction, drought, air pollution, water pollution and illegal trade.

Reptiles

Fish
Colombia has high fish diversity, with a 2017 estimate suggesting 1,494 species of freshwater fishes. Following a rapid inventory of the Bajo Caguán-Caquetá region in 2019, there are 513 known species in the Caquetá river and 148 known species in the Caguán. During this inventory eight species were identified as possibly new to science.

Molluscs

There are more than 80 genera of land gastropods in (continental) Colombia.

Insects

See also
 List of invasive species in Colombia
 Animal rights in Colombia
 Flora of Colombia
 List of national parks of Colombia

References

External links 

 Rapid biological inventory of Colombia's Bajo Caguán-Caquetá region
 Rapid biological inventory of La Lindosa, Capricho, and Cerritos